The Eighth Round  by Zeke Wilson (II) is a non-fiction literary work that documents a precedent-setting court battle about one form of racism that had previously not been defined legally; that of same-race discrimination, wherein the perpetrator and the object of the discrimination are of the same racial group.

It is of interest to note that this, the first case in the US to reach a Federal court jury to challenge the concept of same-race discrimination, did not occur until September 11, 2000, when a case was brought by race-black licensed boxing promoter Zeke Wilson against a state sports commission headed by a race-black chairman for damage reparations and punitive redress after his right to conduct professional boxing events was violated.

References 

Books about race and ethnicity
2009 non-fiction books